Alexandros Tzannis (born 1979 in Athens) is a Greek painter. His work has been shown at the Künstlerhaus Bethanien in Berlin, Germany, the New Benaki Museum, Athens and the Macedonian Museum of Contemporary Art, Thessaloniki, Greece.

Career
Tzannis graduated from the Athens School of Fine Arts. He is based in London and Athens.

He is represented by The Breeder gallery in Athens.

Exhibitions

Selected solo shows

2010 
 “Scattered Memories From the Next Millennium”, The Breeder Playroom, Athens

2007 
 “Doomed by Fantasy”, The Breeder, Athens

Selected group exhibitions

2010 
 Arrivals and Departures, Europe, Mole Vanvitelliana, Ancona curated by Andrea Bruciati and Walter Gasperoni

2009 
 Heaven, 2nd Athens Biennial, Athens, curated by Nadia Argyropoulou
 Tape Modern 10, Tape Modern, Berlin
 Paint-ID, Macedonian Museum of Contemporary Art, Thessaloniki, curated by Sotiris Bahtetzis
 The first image, Centre Regional d'Art Contemporain Languedic Roussilion, Sète, France, curated by Denys Zacharopoulos,
 The Forgotten Bar Project, Open Space, Art Cologne, Cologne

2008 
 "Ausländer in Berlin", Citric Gallery, Brescia, Italy curated by Margherita Belaief
 Forgotten Bar Project, Berlin

2007 
 Stranger than Paradise, Galerie Charlotte Moser, Geneva, curated by Max Henry
 Topoi, works from the Collection of the State Museum of Contemporary Art, New Benaki Museum, Athens, curated by Dennis Zacharopoulos
 True Romance, The Breeder, Athens
 I sigxroni Elliniki Skini, Helexpo Garage, Athens, curated by Nadjia Argyropoulou
 Who's Here ? Macedonian Museum of Contemporary Art, and State Museum of Contemporary Art, curated by Dennis Zacharopoulos
 Gegen den Strich, Künstlerhaus Bethanien, Berlin, curated by Christoph Tannert and Valeria Schulte-Fischedick
 Degree Show, Athens School of Fine Arts

2006 
 Art Basel Miami Beach (under the auspices of The Breeder )
 Art Forum Berlin, (under the auspices of The Breeder )
 What Remains is Future, Patras, Cultural Capital of Europe, curated by Nadja Argyropoulou

References 

Living people
1979 births
Greek contemporary artists
Artists from Athens